The Premio 40 Principales for Best International Song is an honor presented annually at Los Premios 40 Principales.

References

Best International Song
2006 establishments in Spain
Awards established in 2006